The Moroccan Golf Classic was a golf tournament on the Challenge Tour. It ran annually from 2002 to 2010, except 2007.

Winners

External links
Coverage on the Challenge Tour's official site

Former Challenge Tour events
Golf tournaments in Morocco
Recurring sporting events established in 2002
Recurring sporting events disestablished in 2010
Defunct sports competitions in Morocco